The 2022–23 Middle Tennessee Blue Raiders men's basketball team represents Middle Tennessee State University during the 2022–23 NCAA Division I men's basketball season. The team is led by fifth-year head coach Nick McDevitt, and plays their home games at Murphy Center in Murfreesboro, Tennessee as members of Conference USA (C-USA).

Previous season 
The Blue Raiders finished the 2021–22 season 26–11, 13–5 in C-USA play to finish to win the East Division. They defeated UTEP in quarterfinals of the C-USA tournament before losing to UAB in the semifinals. They were invited to the CBI where they defeated California Baptist, Boston University and Abilene Christian to advance to the championship game where they lost to UNC Wilmington.

Offseason

Departures

Incoming transfers

2022 recruiting class

Roster

Schedule and results

|-
!colspan=9 style=|Regular season

|-
!colspan=9 style=| Conference USA tournament

Source

See also
 2022–23 Middle Tennessee Blue Raiders women's basketball team

References

Middle Tennessee Blue Raiders men's basketball seasons
Middle Tennessee Blue Raiders
Middle Tennessee men's basketball
Middle Tennessee men's basketball